Albert Degnan was a Scottish professional footballer who played in the Scottish League for Alloa Athletic as an outside right. He played in a friendly match for an Army XI (represented by the Scottish Command) versus a Scotland XI in 1940.

Career statistics

References

Scottish footballers
Brentford F.C. players
Scottish Football League players
Year of birth missing
Year of death missing
Place of birth missing
Place of death missing
Association football outside forwards
Rutherglen Glencairn F.C. players
Charlton Athletic F.C. players
Albion Rovers F.C. players
Alloa Athletic F.C. players